Stresemann's bent-toed gecko (Cyrtodactylus stresemanni) is a species of lizard in the family Gekkonidae. The species is endemic to Malaysia.

Etymology
The specific name, stresemanni, is in honor of German ornithologist Erwin Friedrich Theodor Stresemann.

Geographic range
C. stresemanni is found in Perak, Malaysia.

Habitat
The preferred natural habitat of C. stresemanni is forest.

Description

Reproduction
C. stresemanni is oviparous.

References

Further reading
Rösler H, Glaw F (2008). "A new species of Cyrtodactylus Gray, 1827 (Squamata: Gekkonidae) from Malaysia including a literature survey of mensural and meristic data in the genus". Zootaxa 1729: 8–22. (Cyrtodactylus stresemanni, new species).

Cyrtodactylus
Reptiles described in 2008